These are the Billboard magazine R&B albums that reached number one in 1998.

Chart history

See also
1998 in music
R&B number-one hits of 1998 (USA)

1998